David Barnett (born 11 January 1970) is an English journalist and author. He has several published books, including Hinterland (Immanion Press, 2005, re-issued 2008), Angelglass (Immanion Press, 2007) and The Janus House and Other Two-Faced Tales (Immanion Press, 2009). Born in Wigan, Lancashire, England, he has worked at the Telegraph & Argus.

Bibliography

Novels
 Hinterland (Immanion Press, 1 April 2005; paperback )
 Angelglass (Immanion Press, 15 November 2007; paperback )
 The Janus House and Other Two-Faced Tales (Immanion Press, 24 December 2009; paperback )
 popCULT! (Pendragon Press, 31 March 2011, paperback )
 Gideon Smith and the Mechanical Girl (Tor Books, September 10, 2013)
 Gideon Smith and the Brass Dragon (Tor Books, September 16, 2014)
 Gideon Smith and the Mask of the Ripper (Tor Books, April 14, 2015)
 The Handover (Trapeze, April 29, 2021)
 Alien: Colony War (Titan Books, April 26, 2022)

Short stories
 The End of the World Show (Postscripts magazine, published Winter 2006) - giant lizards attacking Tokyo and asteroids and zombies.
 Go (You Are Here, Redbeck Press, September 2006) - about the ghost of Jack Kerouac
 It's Nice But I Wouldn't Want To Die Here (Visionary Tongue magazine, April 2006)
 What Would Nite-Owl Do? (All Saints No Sinners Magazine, 2006)
 State of Grace (Postscripts, PS Publishing, issue ten, Summer 2007)
 Woman's Work (in Encounters of Sherlock Holmes, Titan Books, 2013)

Comics
Under the pen name "Sax", David Barnett wrote stories for two short story comics. Both featured the open-source character, Jenny Everywhere.

 My Bloody Valentine - Illustrated by John Miers (2002)
 The Death of Jenny Everywhere - Illustrated by Catherine Wright (2003)

References

External links
 davidbarnett.wordpress.com his official homepage
 Immanion Press publishers of Angelglass and Hinterland
 Review of Hinterland by the Fortean Times
 Interview with David Barnett by The Alien Online
 Interview with David Barnett by the Fortean Times
 Article on getting published by David Barnett for The British Science Fiction Association's Matrix magazine
 A review at Infinity plus with a sample

 Story Behind Gideon Smith and the Mechanical Girl - Online Essay by David Barnett

1970 births
English fantasy writers
English male journalists
21st-century English novelists
Living people
People from Wigan
English male short story writers
English short story writers
English male novelists
21st-century British short story writers
21st-century English male writers